The Wales national women's football team represents Wales in international football.

The team has never qualified for the FIFA Women's World Cup or the UEFA European Women's Championship. They most recently came the closest they ever have to qualifying for their first ever FIFA Women's World Cup going all the way to the FIFA Women's World Cup UEFA play-off final before falling to a 2–1 defeat at the fate of an opposition last minute winner in extra time against the Switzerland women's national football team.

All of Welsh women's football clubs play in the Welsh women's football league system. Wales, as a country of the United Kingdom, is not a member of the International Olympic Committee and therefore the national team does not compete in the Olympic Games.

Team image

Media coverage
Live television broadcast rights are held by BBC Cymru Wales (Welsh & English language commentary) until 2027.

Colours and logo
The primary kit has long been all-red. The crest of the Football Association of Wales features a rampant Welsh Dragon on a white shield. From 1920, the shield was surrounded by a red border, and the letters 'FAW' were added in 1926. The badge was redesigned in 1951, adding a green border with 11 daffodils, as well as the Welsh-language motto Gorau Chwarae Cyd Chwarae ("The best play is team play"). The motto was briefly removed in 1984, but the badge stayed largely the same until 2010, when the shield was changed to feature rounded sides and the motto banner was changed from white to red and green. The dragon also changed from rampant to rampant regardant. The motto was removed again in 2019, following another major redesign of the badge, which saw the top of the shield flattened and the sides changed not to curve outwards; the green border was also thinned and the daffodils removed.

Kit supplier

Results and fixtures

 The following is a list of match results in the last 12 months, as well as any future matches that have been scheduled.

Legend

2022

2023

Coaching staff

Current coaching staff

Manager history

 Sylvia Gore (1979–1989)
 Sue Lopez (1995–1996)
 Roy Thomas (1996–2000)
 Sian Williams (2000–2003)
 Andy Beattie (2003–2007)
 Adrian Tucker (2007–2010)
 Jarmo Matikainen (2010–2014)
 Jayne Ludlow (2014–2021)
 Gemma Grainger (2021–)

Players

Current squad
 The following 26 players were named to the squad for the friendly against  on 12 November 2022.
 Caps and goals updated as of the game against  on 6 September 2022.

Recent call-ups
 The following players have been called up for a Wales squad in the last 12 months.
 This information may be out-of-date.

Captains
 Jayne Ludlow (−2012)
 Jess Fishlock (2012–2015)
 Sophie Ingle (2015–)

Records

*Active players in bold, statistics correct as of September 2022.

Most capped players

Top goalscorers

Competitive record

FIFA Women's World Cup

*Draws include knockout matches decided on penalty kicks.

UEFA Women's Championship

*Draws include knockout matches decided by penalty kicks.

European Competition for Women's Football (Unofficial)
1979 : Group Stage

Algarve Cup
The Algarve Cup is a global invitational tournament for national teams in women's soccer hosted by the Portuguese Football Federation (FPF). Held annually in the Algarve region of Portugal since 1994, it is one of the most prestigious women's football events, alongside the Women's World Cup and Women's Olympic Football.

Other tournaments

See also
Sport in Wales
Football in Wales
Women's football in Wales
Wales women's national football team results
List of Wales women's international footballers
Wales women's national under-20 football team
Wales women's national under-17 football team
Wales women's national futsal team

Notes

References

External links
Official website
FIFA profile

 
European women's national association football teams
1973 establishments in Wales
1973 establishments in the United Kingdom